El Ejido Valdez, is a community land in the Mexican state of Sonora, approximately  east from Sonoyta.  It is a section of the municipality of General Plutarco Elías Calles.

Demographics
According to the 2005 Census, the community had a population of 115 inhabitants.  60 inhabitants were male and 55 inhabitants were female.

References

www.inegi.gob.mx

External links
 INEGI: Instituto Nacional de Estadística, Geografía e Informática

Populated places in Sonora